The 2013–14 Charlotte 49ers men's basketball team represented the University of North Carolina at Charlotte during the 2013–14 NCAA Division I men's basketball season. The 49ers, led by fourth head coach Alan Major, played their home games at the Dale F. Halton Arena and were new members Conference USA. They finished the season 17–14, 7–9 in C-USA play to finish in a tie for eighth place. They advanced to the quarterfinals of the C-USA tournament where they lost to Louisiana Tech.

Roster

Schedule

|-
!colspan=12 style="background:#00703C; color:#FFFFFF;"| Exhibition

|-
!colspan=12 style="background:#00703C; color:#FFFFFF;"| Non-conference 

|-
!colspan=12 style="background:#00703C; color:#FFFFFF;"| C-USA regular season

|-
!colspan=12 style="background:#00703C; color:#FFFFFF;"| Conference USA tournament

References

Charlotte
Charlotte 49ers men's basketball seasons